Spencer Long (born November 8, 1990) is a former American football center. He played college football at the University of Nebraska–Lincoln and was drafted by the Washington Redskins in the third round of the 2014 NFL Draft. He has also been a member of the New York Jets, Buffalo Bills, and San Francisco 49ers.

College career

Long attended Elkhorn High School in Elkhorn, Nebraska. He played defensive end on the Antlers football team, and also played baseball. He walked on to the Nebraska Cornhuskers football team for the 2009 season. He redshirted in 2009, and did not appear in a game in 2010. In 2011, Long was one of three Nebraska offensive linemen to start in all of the Huskers' games. He also started in every game during the 2012 season. In 2013, he played in only six games before suffering a season-ending knee injury.

Professional career

Washington Redskins

Long was drafted by the Washington Redskins in the third round, 78th overall, of the 2014 NFL Draft. On May 16, 2014, Long signed his four-year rookie contract, worth 2.85 million.

With the release of former starting right guard, Chris Chester, Long was given the chance to compete for the starting position. He ended up losing out to Brandon Scherff, who originally was expected to become the starting right tackle. He would then become the starting left guard after regular starter, Shawn Lauvao, was placed on the team's injured reserve in September 2015. In 2016, Long became the team's starting center after a season-ending injury to Kory Lichtensteiger in week 3. On November 21, 2017, Long was placed on injured reserve after dealing with knee tendinitis.

New York Jets
On March 18, 2018, Long signed a four-year, $28 million contract with the New York Jets. He started 13 games in 2018 at center and left guard but was released on February 5, 2019.

Buffalo Bills
On February 12, 2019, Long signed a three-year $12.6 million contract with the Buffalo Bills. On March 10, 2020, Long's second-year option was exercised by the Bills. He was released on August 4, 2020.

San Francisco 49ers 
Long was signed by the San Francisco 49ers on August 13, 2020, but announced his retirement three days later.

References

External links
Nebraska Cornhuskers bio

1990 births
Living people
American football centers
American football offensive guards
Buffalo Bills players
Nebraska Cornhuskers football players
New York Jets players
Players of American football from Nebraska
Sportspeople from Omaha, Nebraska
Washington Redskins players
San Francisco 49ers players